Vanja Gesheva-Tsvetkova (born April 6, 1960) is a Bulgarian sprint canoer who competed from the late 1970s to the late 1980s. Competing in two Summer Olympics, she won four medals with one gold (1988: K-1 500 m), two silvers (1980: K-1 500 m, 1988: K-2 500 m), and one bronze (1988: K-4 500 m).

Gesheva also won five medals at the ICF Canoe Sprint World Championships with a gold (K-1 500 m: 1986), two silvers (K-1 500 m: 1983, K-4 500 m: 1978), and two bronzes (K-2 500 m: 1977, 1986).

References
DatabaseOlympics.com profile

Sports-reference.com profile

1960 births
Bulgarian female canoeists
Canoeists at the 1980 Summer Olympics
Canoeists at the 1988 Summer Olympics
Living people
Olympic canoeists of Bulgaria
Olympic gold medalists for Bulgaria
Olympic silver medalists for Bulgaria
Olympic bronze medalists for Bulgaria
Olympic medalists in canoeing
ICF Canoe Sprint World Championships medalists in kayak
People from Plovdiv Province

Medalists at the 1988 Summer Olympics
Medalists at the 1980 Summer Olympics